Capecchi is an Italian surname. Notable people with the surname include:

Eros Capecchi (born 1986), Italian cyclist
Luca Capecchi (born 1974), Italian footballer
Mario Capecchi (born 1937), Italian-born American geneticist
Renato Capecchi (1923–1998), Italian opera singer, actor and opera director

Italian-language surnames